Kathleen Anne Kauth (born March 28, 1979 in Saratoga Springs, New York) is an American ice hockey player, formerly playing for the Brampton Thunder, when they were affiliated with the NWHL.

Playing career

USA Hockey
Kauth made the pre-Olympic cut for the 2002 United States Olympic hockey team. She won a bronze medal at the 2006 Winter Olympics.

CWHL
Kauth, along with such as Allyson Fox, Kim McCullough, along with national team members Sami Jo Small and Jennifer Botterill spearheaded an initiative to form the Canadian Women's Hockey League.  The players worked with a group of volunteer business people to form the CWHL by following the example of the National Lacrosse League. The league would be responsible for all travel, ice rental and uniform costs, plus some equipment.

Personal
Kauth graduated from Brown University in pre-med in 2001. Kauth is also a mother to two daughters and son with her partner, four-time Canadian Olympian, Jayna Hefford. Both have also served on the coaching staff for the Toronto Lady Blues women's ice hockey program under head coach Vicky Sunohara.

Kauth's father, Don, was killed on September 11, 2001 while working in the World Trade Center for Keefe, Bruyette & Woods. He was employed as a bank analyst on the 85th floor of the South Tower, the second tower struck by a plane on that tragic day.

References

External links
Kathleen Kauth's U.S. Olympic Team bio

1979 births
Living people
American expatriate ice hockey players in Canada
American women's ice hockey forwards
Brampton Thunder players
Brown Bears women's ice hockey players
Ice hockey players at the 2006 Winter Olympics
Ice hockey players from New York (state)
Lesbian sportswomen
LGBT ice hockey players
LGBT people from New York (state)
American LGBT sportspeople
Medalists at the 2006 Winter Olympics
Olympic bronze medalists for the United States in ice hockey
Sportspeople from Saratoga Springs, New York